New Zealand participated in the ninth Winter Paralympics in Turin, Italy.

New Zealand entered two athletes in the following sports:

Alpine skiing: 2 male

Medalists

See also
2006 Winter Paralympics
New Zealand at the 2006 Winter Olympics

External links
Torino 2006 Paralympic Games
International Paralympic Committee
Paralympics New Zealand

2006
Nations at the 2006 Winter Paralympics
Winter Paralympics